{{Infobox musical artist  
| name                = Odes of Ecstasy
| image                 = odesofecstasy2007.jpg
| caption            = Odes of Ecstasy| image_size            = 250
| landscape           = Yes
| background          = group_or_band
| origin              = Greece
| genre               = Symphonic death metal, gothic metal
| years_active        = 1993–present 
| label               = The End Records, Independent
| associated_acts     = 
| website                 = 
| current_members     = Christina ManiatiNikos BaltasGiannis FasoulakisGiorgos PagidasNikos SimigiannisIrini Tsiklou
| past_members        = 
}}Odes of Ecstasy''' is a Greek death metal/gothic metal band formed in 1993 by Dimitris Bikos and Iosif Nikou.

History
The band formed in November 1993. In 1994, Dimitris Panayiotidis joined the band on guitar, and in December 1995 they released a promo tape containing one song, "Theogony."

In the summer of 1996 they recorded their first demo, Atheistic Emotions, which featured vocals by Christina Maniati. The demo includes three symphonic death metal songs, a cover of Black Sabbath's "Paranoid," and an ambient tune with only female vocals, keyboards, and electric guitars. The specific release was announced as the "Promo of the Month by the Greek Metal Hammer magazine. Following the release of the demo, Dimitris Panayiotidis left the band for military service and was replaced by Nikos Baltas.

In 1997, they released a single-song promo entitled Words of Insanity, which gave them the opportunity to sign with the American label The End Records, which released their first official album, Embossed Dream in Four Acts. The sound of this album is best characterized as death metal featuring brutal male and operatic female vocals, and influences from classical music. The second release of the band came in 2000, Deceitful Melody.

After that, the band came to a standstill for several years due to many line-up changes, caused mainly by the obligatory military service of some of the band’s members. In 2004 the band formed again with a new line-up and a different musical orientation. The band played several shows to  promote the news songs from their upcoming release, the self-titled Odes Of Ecstasy promo (2006) which had five songs. A full album was finished in October 2007.

YouTube links:

One with the Darkness 
https://www.youtube.com/watch?v=FAd6_3XS0Mo&list=PL7A7FD86EA83311DC&index=8

The Floating City of Sun 
https://www.youtube.com/watch?v=LCn7sjKMgqo&list=PL7A7FD86EA83311DC&index=11

Band members

Former members
 Iosif Nikou - bass
 Dimitris Bikos - vocals, guitar
 Savvas Dandoulakis - keyboards
 Christina Maniati - vocals
 Irini Tsiklou - keyboards
 Giannis Fasoulakis - backing vocals, guitar
 Giorgos Pagidas - bass
 Dimitris Panayiotidis - guitar

Current members
 Nikos Baltas - vocals, guitar
 Nikos Simigiannis - drums

 Discography 
 Theogony (Promo, 1995)
 Atheistic Emotions (Demo, 1996)
 Faithless/Never Again (Split with Nocturnal Howling, Daimonion, 1997)
 Words Of Insanity (Promo, 1997)
 Embossed Dream in Four Acts (Album, The End, 1998)
 Deceitful Melody (Album, The End, 2000)
 Odes Of Ecstasy promo (2006)
 ''Odes Of Ecstasy (2007)

Greek death metal musical groups
Greek symphonic metal musical groups
Musical groups established in 1993
1993 establishments in Greece